This is a select list of artists, architects and craftspeople who were either Cornish or worked in Cornwall.

Artists and craftspeople 
For some others, see Newlyn School, Newlyn Copper and List of St Ives artists

Architects
 Geoffrey Bazeley (1906–1989), Modernist architect
 Richard Coad (1825–1900), Victorian architect
 Thomas Cundy (senior) (1765–1825), architect
 Benjamin Gummow (1766–1844), architect 
 Rod McAllister (born 1961), architect
 Peter Hugo McClure (born 1947), artist and architect
 Edmund Sedding (1836–1868), architect and musician, resident at Penzance
 J. P. St Aubyn (1815–1895), architect
 Silvanus Trevail (1851–1903), architect

References 

 artists
Artists, architects and craftspeople
Lists of English people by occupation